Alessandro Cibocchi (born 18 September 1982) is an Italian footballer who plays as a defender.

Career

Early career
Born in Terni, Umbria, Cibocchi started his career at hometown club Ternana Calcio, which he made his league debut on 14 October 2001, as one of the starting XI. He was replaced by Cristian Lizzori in the 65th minute and the match Ternana losing to Ancona 0–1.

Torino & false accounting scandal
In January 2002, he swapped club with Torino Calcio's Emanuele Calaiò, which later found that the pure player exchange were with inflated price tag on both players, in order to increase the selling profit on the balance sheet. Despite it also created another investment/cost on players and counter-weight the profit, but also created an asset with higher nominal value than its fair value. The deals later fined by Italian Football Federation (FIGC) 8 years later.

He was awarded no.26 shirt in 2001–02 Serie A but did not made any appearances with Torino.

Cibocchi was loaned to Viterbese in 2002–03 Serie C1 but the deal was cancelled in January 2003, and returned to Ternana on loan.

Return to Ternana
In July 2003 he returned to Ternana in permanent deal as the club exchanged him with Calaiò for a second time, he also signed a length deal partially to amortise his nominal price tag in years. He left for Meda of Serie C2 that season. With theLombard club, he played a career high so far with 24 league games in a single season.

After only played 3 times in the first half of 2004–05 Serie B, he left for Serie C2 club Potenza. In the next season, he only played once in Serie B. Cibocchi returned to Serie C2 again in 2006–07 season. After Ternana relegated to Serie C1 in 2007, he returned to his mother club and signed a new 3-year contract. He played 23 Prima Divisione/Serie C1 matches for Ternana since his return.

From Lega Pro to Serie B
In August 2009 he left for Lega Pro Seconda Divisione club Colligiana. The team finished as the 17th and went bankrupt after the season. After failed to find a club in summer transfer window, he left for Serie D (top division of regional/amateur/non-professional leagues) side Deruta. However, he was signed by Serie B side PortoSummaga in December 2010 (paperwork completed on 7 January 2011). The club at that time was the 21st with 18 points (round 20) and far away to escape from relegation zone. He made his debut on 8 January 2011, the first game after the winter break, replacing another new signing Ivan Franceschini at half time. That match PortoSummaga losing to Crotone 0–2.

Swindon Town

In 2011 he moved to Swindon Town under Paolo Di Canio where he was part of the EFL League Two winning side. He became something of a fan favourite in large part due to his social media presence and the popularised chant 'Dance with Cibocchi'. He terminated his contract by mutual consent for personal reasons on 22 August 2012.

Honours

Swindon Town
 League Two: Champions 2011–12

References

External links
 
 
 Football.it Profile 

Italian footballers
Serie B players
Ternana Calcio players
Torino F.C. players
U.S. Viterbese 1908 players
Potenza S.C. players
A.S.D. Portogruaro players
A.S.D. Olimpia Colligiana players
Swindon Town F.C. players
Association football defenders
People from Terni
1982 births
Living people
Italian expatriate footballers
Italian expatriate sportspeople in England
English Football League players
Expatriate footballers in England
Footballers from Umbria
A.C. Meda 1913 players
Sportspeople from the Province of Terni